KCML (99.9 FM, "Lite FM") is a radio station in St. Cloud, Minnesota, airing an adult contemporary music format. The station is owned by Leighton Broadcasting.

On Monday, February 18, 2019, KCML rebranded as "99.9 Today's Lite FM" with no change in format, however Delilah's love songs program was added for evenings.

History
The station was previously known as "Lite Rock 99.9". In early January 2016, the station flipped to "More FM", keeping the same format but changing its branding and website.

References

External links
99.9 Lite FM official website

Radio stations in St. Cloud, Minnesota
Mainstream adult contemporary radio stations in the United States
Radio stations established in 1998